The 2013 African Women's Junior Handball Championship was the 20th edition of the African Women's Junior Handball Championship. The event, organized by the African Handball Confederation, under the supervision of the International Handball Federation, took place in the Republic of the Congo, in one host city, Oyo, from September 1 to 8. Seven teams participated on the tournament. Angola, dethroned defending champion Congo thus securing its 7th title.

Angola were the champions and the top three teams qualified for the 2014 Women's Junior World Handball Championship, in Croatia.

Preliminary round
The seven teams were split into two groups. The top two teams from each group advanced to the semi-finals while the last three played for the 5th to 7th places.

Group A

Group B

5-8 Classification

5th place match

Final round

Bracket

Semifinals

Bronze medal match

Final

Final standings

Awards

See also
 2012 African Women's Handball Championship
 2013 African Women's Youth Handball Championship

References

External links
 Tournament page on the African Handball Confederation official website

2013 in African handball
2013 in the Republic of the Congo sport
African Junior
Junior
International sports competitions hosted by the Republic of the Congo
Women's handball in the Republic of the Congo
African Women's Youth Handball Championship